This is a list of television broadcasters which provide coverage of La Liga, Spanish football's top-level competition.

Broadcasters

Spain and Andorra 

Notes

International broadcasters

Africa

Americas

Asia and Oceania

Europe

Middle East and North Africa

References

External links 
 La Liga website

La Liga
La Liga
Association football on television
Sports television in Spain